The Chinese Taipei national badminton team is a badminton team that represents Republic of China (Taiwan) in international badminton team competitions. The national team was formed in 1973. The Chinese Taipei women's team finished as semifinalists at the 2006 Uber Cup.

The mixed team have never got past the quarterfinals at the Sudirman Cup.

Participation in BWF competitions

Thomas Cup

Uber Cup

Sudirman Cup

Participation in Asia Championships 

Men's team

Women's team

Mixed team

Current squad 
The following players were selected to represent Chinese Taipei at the 2022 Thomas & Uber Cup.

Male players
Chou Tien-chen
Wang Tzu-wei
Lu Chia-hung
Liao Jhuo-fu
Lee Yang
Wang Chi-lin
Lu Ching-yao
Yang Po-han
Su Ching-heng
Ye Hong-wei

Female players
Tai Tzu-ying
Hsu Wen-chi
Sung Shuo-yun
Chen Su-yu
Hsu Ya-ching
Chang Ching-hui
Lee Chih-chen
Lin Wan-ching
Lee Chia-hsin
Teng Chun-hsun

References

Badminton
National badminton teams
Badminton in Taiwan